Neziri is an Persian surname that may refer to the following people:

Arif Neziri known as Arif Hiqmeti (c. 1870s–1916), leader of a peasant Revolt in Albania
Bojan Neziri (born 1982), Serbian football defender 
Inis Neziri (born 2001), Albanian singer 
Kaltrina Neziri, Kosovar model and beauty pageant titleholder 
Medjit Neziri (born 1990), Macedonian football defender
Mërgim Neziri (born 1993), German–Albanian footballer
Nooralotta Neziri (born 1992), Finnish hurdler

See also
Nezir, people with the given name
Nəzirli, a village and municipality in the Barda Rayon of Azerbaijan

Albanian-language surnames